Dan Stone is a historian. As professor  of Modern History at Royal Holloway, University of London, and director of its Holocaust Research Institute, Stone specializes in 20th-century European history, genocide, and fascism. He is the author or editor of several works on Holocaust historiography, including Histories of the Holocaust (2010) and an edited collection, The Historiography of the Holocaust (2004).

Selected works 
 (2001), ed. Theoretical Interpretations of the Holocaust. Amsterdam: Editions Rodopi BV.
 (2002). Breeding Superman: Nietzsche, Race and Eugenics in Edwardian and Interwar Britain. Liverpool: Liverpool University Press.
 (2003). Responses to Nazism in Britain, 1933–1939: Before War and Holocaust. Basingstoke and New York: Palgrave Macmillan.
 (2003). Constructing the Holocaust: A Study in Historiography. London and Portland: Vallentine Mitchell.
 (2004), ed. The Historiography of the Holocaust. Basingstoke and New York: Palgrave Macmillan.
 (2006). History, Memory and Mass Atrocity: Essays on the Holocaust and Genocide. London and Portland: Vallentine Mitchell.
 (2008), ed. The Historiography of Genocide. Basingstoke: Palgrave Macmillan.
 (2010). Histories of the Holocaust. Oxford: Oxford University Press.
 (2013). The Holocaust, Fascism and Memory: Essays in the History of Ideas. Basingstoke and New York: Palgrave Macmillan.
 (2014). Goodbye to All That? The Story of Europe since 1945. Oxford: Oxford University Press.
 (2015). The Liberation of the Camps: The End of the Holocaust and its Aftermath. New Haven and London: Yale University Press.
 (2017). Concentration Camps: A Short History. Oxford: Oxford University Press.
 (2023). The Holocaust: An Unfinished History. London: Pelican Books.

References

External links 
 "Dan Stone, Royal Holloway, University of London.

1971 births
Living people
Place of birth missing (living people)
21st-century British historians
Historians of the Holocaust
Historiographers